Ó Deargáin is a Gaelic-Irish surname, which was found in Leinster and Munster.

It is now anglicised as "Dergan", "Dargan" or "Dorgan".

See also
 Michael Dargan (born 1929), former Irish cricketer.
 William Dargan (1799–1867), the father of Irish railways.
 Theo Dorgan (born 1953), Irish poet, writer and lecturer.

References
 http://www.irishtimes.com/ancestor/surname/index.cfm?fuseaction=Go.&UserID=

Irish families
Irish-language masculine surnames
Surnames of Irish origin
Surnames